Chris McGarry (born August 19, 1966) is an American actor born in Roselle, New Jersey, known for his performance in the American television series Law & Order on NBC from 2001 to 2005. Some of his other television acting credits include Law & Order: Special Victims Unit, CSI: Crime Scene Investigation, The Sopranos, The Unit, Boston Legal, Mad Men, Big Love and 24. In 2012, he had a four-episode stint as Dr. Banks in the series Awake.

McGarry has also performed on stage in the New York City and Chicago area.

References

External links

1966 births
Male actors from New Jersey
American male film actors
American male stage actors
American male television actors
Living people
People from Roselle, New Jersey